MotivePower, Inc. (MPI) is an American manufacturer of diesel-electric locomotives. The company is a wholly-owned subsidiary of Wabtec, and traces its history back to the MK Rail division of Morrison-Knudsen.

History 

Morrison-Knudsen established a separate rail division, MK Rail, in 1972. Morrison-Knudsen spun-off the division in 1993; it became a publicly traded company in 1994. After Morrison-Knudsen's bankruptcy in 1996, MK Rail renamed itself MotivePower Industries, doing business as Boise Locomotive. The company merged with Westinghouse Air Brake Company in November 1999 to form the Wabtec. Wabtec renamed the Boise Locomotive division to MotivePower in 2000. MotivePower continues as a wholly owned subsidiary of Wabtec. On September 18, 2019 several months following Wabtec's merger with GE Transportation, Wabtec announced the MotivePower Boise plant will close in early 2020 and production shifted to Wabtec's legacy GE Transportation plant in Erie, Pennsylvania.

Products 
MotivePower's flagship product is the MPI MPXpress passenger locomotive. Over two hundred locomotives have been built for commuter rail operators in the United States and Canada.

 MPXpress
 MPEX Switchers (MP14B, MP20B, MP20C, & MP21B)
 HSP46
 MP8AC-3 (R156)
 CBH class (MP27CN, MP33CN, & MP33C)

References

External links 
 

Locomotive manufacturers of the United States
Wabtec
Companies based in Boise, Idaho
Manufacturing companies based in Idaho